Aquiles Serdán is a station along Line 7 of the Mexico City Metro.  It is located in the Colonia La Preciosa neighborhood of the Azcapotzalco borough of northwestern Mexico City.

General information
The station opened on 29 November 1988.

Name and iconography
Its logo represents the bust of Aquiles Serdán, a martyr in the Mexican Revolution.

Ridership

References

External links
 

Mexico City Metro Line 7 stations
Railway stations opened in 1988
1988 establishments in Mexico
Mexico City Metro stations in Azcapotzalco
Accessible Mexico City Metro stations